The Fantasia in F minor by Franz Schubert, D.940 (Op. posth. 103), for piano four hands (two players at one piano), is one of Schubert's most important works for more than one pianist and one of his most important piano works altogether. He composed it in 1828, the last year of his life. A dedication to his former pupil Caroline Esterházy can only be found in the posthumous first edition, not in Schubert's autograph.

Musicologist Christopher Gibbs has described the work as "among not only his greatest but his most original" compositions for piano duet.

History
Franz Schubert began writing the Fantasia in January 1828 in Vienna.  The work was completed in March of that year, and first performed in May. Schubert's friend Eduard von Bauernfeld recorded in his diary on May 9 that a memorable duet was played, by Schubert and Franz Lachner. The work was dedicated to Caroline Esterházy, with whom Schubert was in (unrequited) love.

Schubert died in November 1828. After his death, his friends and family undertook to have a number of his works published. This work is one of those pieces; it was published by Anton Diabelli in March 1829. The original manuscript resides at the Austrian National Library.

Structure
The Fantasia is divided into four movements, that are interconnected and played without pause. A typical performance lasts about 20 minutes.
 Allegro molto moderato
 Largo
 Scherzo. Allegro vivace
 Finale. Allegro molto moderato

The basic idea of a fantasia with four connected movements also appears in Schubert's Wanderer Fantasy, and represents a stylistic bridge between the traditional sonata form and the essentially free-form tone poem. The basic structure of the two fantasies is essentially the same: allegro, slow movement, scherzo, allegro with fugue. The form of this work, with its relatively tight structure (more so than the fantasias of Beethoven and Mozart), was influential on the work of Franz Liszt, who arranged the Wanderer Fantasy as a piano concerto, among other transcriptions he made of Schubert's music.

First movement
The piece opens with a lyrical melody with dotted rhythms that is reminiscent of the Hungarian style. The theme is eventually repeated in F major, before briefly repeating in F minor, and transitioning into a somber, almost funereal, second theme. After developing the two themes, he eventually returns to a version of the second theme in F major, which modulates into F minor for the start of the second movement.

Second movement
The second movement opens with an angry, somewhat turbulent fortissimo theme in F minor. While marked largo, the frequently double-dotted first theme lends a great deal of tension to this movement. Eventually the first theme gives way to a quiet, lyrical second theme. The first theme is reprised, ending on the C major dominant. Schubert had recently heard Paganini's second violin concerto, whose second movement inspired the themes here.

Third movement
Following the F minor, agitated second movement, the third movement scherzo is a bright, lively movement in the same key, reminiscent of the scherzos of other works Schubert wrote at this time, like those of his piano trios. After a delicate D major trio, the scherzo returns, at first seemingly in F minor. The repeat of the scherzo shifts between A major and F minor, ultimately ending on C octaves that drive into a transition back toward F minor for the finale.

Finale
The finale begins with a restatement of the first movement's primary theme in both F minor and F major, before transitioning into a fugue based on its second theme. The fugue builds to a climax, ending abruptly on the C major dominant, instead of resolving into either F major or minor. After a bar of silence, the first theme briefly reprises, building rapidly to concluding chords that echo the second theme before subsiding into a quiet end. It has been called "the most remarkable cadence in the whole of Schubert's work", as he manages to condense the dichotomies of the two themes into the final eight bars of the work.

Transcriptions
In 1961, Russian composer Dimitri Kabalevsky orchestrated the work, producing a virtuoso piece for one piano soloist playing with a symphony orchestra.

Recordings
The fantasy has been recorded numerous times, including by the following notable performers:
Alfred Brendel with Évelyne Crochet on Vox Box
Sviatoslav Richter and Benjamin Britten on Decca Records/BBC Legends
Evgeny Kissin and James Levine on RCA Victor
Katia and Marielle Labèque on Kml Recordings
Bracha Eden and Alexander Tamir on Brilliant Classics
Justus Frantz and Christoph Eschenbach on EMI
Radu Lupu and Murray Perahia on Sony Classical
Evgeni Koroliov and Ljupka Hadzigeorgieva on Tacet
Duo Tal & Groethuysen on Sony Classical
Aloys and Alfons Kontarsky, Emil and Elena Gilels, and Maria João Pires with Ricardo Castro on Deutsche Grammophon
Jörg Demus and Paul Badura-Skoda several times, including on Westminster, Auvidis Valois, and Audax
Vitya Vronsky and Victor Babin on US Decca
Robert and Gaby Casadesus on Columbia Masterworks
Alexandre Tharaud and Zhu Xiao-Mei on Harmonia Mundi Fr
Malcolm Bilson and Robert D. Levin for Archive
Jos van Immerseel and Claire Chevallier for Alpha
Wyneke Jordans and Leo van Doeselaar for Globe
Andreas Staier & Alexander Melnikov for Harmonia Mundi
The Latsos Piano Duo (Giorgi Latso and Anna Fedorova- Latso) for BHNT
Emil Gilels and Orchestra Sinfonica Di Milano della RAI, conducted by Franco Caracciolo, for Archipel Records.  Live recording of the Schubert-Kabalevsky orchestrated version. ("Emil Gilels in Italy")
Michael Korstick and NDR Sinfonieorchester, conducted by Alun Francis, for Chandos Records. Studio recording of the Schubert-Kabalevsky orchestrated version
Sergio Tiempo and Martha Argerich for Avanticlassic.

Notes

References
 Musical score.

Norman McKay, Elizabeth, Schubert's string and piano duos in context. in Newbould, Brian (1998). Schubert studies, Ashgate, 1998, p. 62-111.

External links

Recording of Fantasia from the Jerusalem Music Centre in MP3 format, performed by Sivan Silver and Gil Garburg (archived on the Wayback Machine)

Piano music by Franz Schubert
Compositions for piano four-hands
1828 compositions
Schubert
Compositions in F minor
Compositions by Franz Schubert published posthumously
Music dedicated to students or teachers